Nankana Sahib is a city and capital of Nankana Sahib District in the Punjab province of Pakistan. It is named after the first Guru of the Sikhs, Guru Nanak, who was born in the city and first began preaching here. Nankana Sahib is the most important religious site for the Sikh religion. According to the census of 2017 the city has a population of 79,540 inhabitants. Until 2005, it was a part of the Sheikhupura District.

History 
The township was founded during the Delhi Sultanate rule by Rai Bhoi, a Hindu and thus was known as Rai-Bhoi-Di-Talwandi. His great-grand son Rai Bular Bhatti, renamed it as 'Nankana Sahib'  after the birth of Guru Nanak. The Gurdwara Nankana Sahib, originally constructed by Sikhs during the Mughal era in around 1600 CE was renovated in 1819–20 CE by Gian-Punjab Maharaja Ranjit Singh The Sikh Conference of Panjab, Jammu and Kashmir, Peshawar, Kangra and Hazara.

During the Akali movement, on 20 February 1921, Narain Das, the Udasi mahant (clergy) of the gurdwara at Nankana Sahib, ordered his men to fire on Akali protesters, leading to the Nankana massacre. The firing was widely condemned, and an agitation was launched until the control of this historic Janam Asthan Gurdwara was restored to the Sikhs. Again in the 1930s and 1940s the Sikhs added more buildings and more architectural design.

Geography
Nankana Sahib and it surroundings were formerly a tehsil of Sheikhupura District. In May 2005, the provincial government raised the status of Nankana Sahib to a district as a way of promoting development in the area. The present status is District Nankana Sahib has three tehsils: Nankana Sahib, Shah Kot, and Sangla Hill.  Before December 2008, District Nankana Sahib also included Safdarabad Tehsil.

There are plans to construct a  university as well as hospitals and health care facilities by the district government with mutual interest of local communities and family of Rai Bular.

In 2007, the Pakistan government announced a plan to set up a university on Sikh religion and culture at Nankana Sahib, the birthplace of Guru Nanak. Chairman of Pakistan's Evacuee Trust Property Board (ETPB), Gen (R) Zulfikar Ali Khan, said that "The international Guru Nanak University planned at Nankana Sahib would have the best architecture, curricula and research centre on Sikh religion and culture".

In 2019 after prolonged efforts of the Sikh community the historical Gurudwara on Nankana sahib was given direct access to pilgrims via the Kartarpur corridor project. The first batch of Sikh pilgrims arrived in Pakistan on 12 November, the historical occasion of the 550th gurupurab (birth anniversary) of Guru Nanak, the founding guru of Sikhism.

Demographics

Languages 
Punjabi is the most widely spoken in Nankana Sahib District, and the district with the highest proportion of Punjabi speakers in the Punjab province.

Transportation
Nankana sahib interchange Exit 3 on M3 motorway (Pakistan)
Railway Station Nankana Sahib on Shorkot–Sheikhupura Branch Line
Faisalabad International Airport 88 km
Allama Iqbal International Airport Lahore 96 km
Jaranwala-Nankana Road

Notable places
 Quba Masjid (A replica of Quba Masjid of Madina) 
 Gurdwara Janam Asthan
 Nankana Lake Resort
 Residency of Baba Guru Nanak
Gurdwara Patti Sahib
Gurdwara Bal Leela
Gurdwara Mal Ji Sahib
Gurdwara Kiara Sahib
Gurdwara Tambu Sahib
And other historical Gurdwaras of Sikhism.

Notable people
 

 Guru Nanak founder and first of the Sikh Gurus
 Rai Bular Bhatti               
 Mohammad Irfan Pakistani cricketer
 Rai Mansab Ali Khan
 Rai Rashid Ahmed Khan
 Shizra Mansab Ali Khan
 Ganga Ram
 Ijaz Shah
 Babra Sharif film actor
 Barjees Tahir

Education

Universities/Higher Education Institutes
 Virtual University of Pakistan Nankana Sahib Campus
 Baba Guru Nanak University

Colleges
 Government G.N Degree College, Nankana Sahib
 Government College of Commerce Nankana Sahib
 Government Govt. G.N. Degree College For Women, Nankana Sahib
 Punjab Group of Colleges Nankana Sahib
 Radiant College Nankana Sahib
 The Message Campus Nankana Sahib
 Superior college, Nankana Sahib
 The City Grammar school & College Nankana Sahib
 Govt College of Commerce Nankana Sahib
 Al-Muarif School & College Nankana Sahib

Schools
 Dar-e-Arqam Schools
 Allied Schools (Pakistan)
 Pak Garrison School

Police stations
There are two Police stations in Nankana Sahib  
 Police Station City Nankana Sahib 
 Police Station Sadar Nankana Sahib

Hospitals 
 District Headquarter Hospital

See also
 Sikhism in Pakistan
 Gurdwara Janam Asthan
 Gurdwara Darbar Sahib Kartarpur 
 Harmandir Sahib
 Gurudwara Sis Ganj Sahib

References

Cities in Punjab (Pakistan)
Sikh places
Sikhism in Pakistan
Populated places in Nankana Sahib District
Populated places in Punjab, Pakistan
Guru Nanak Dev
Memorials to Guru Nanak
Nankana Sahib District